Mervyn Tan Wei Ming  is a Singaporean former major-general who served as Chief of Air Force between 2016 and 2019. He has been serving as the chief executive of Defence Science and Technology Agency since 2021.

He had also served as Deputy Secretary (Technology) and Future Systems and Technology Architect at the Ministry of Defence between 2019 and 2021.

Education
Tan received the Singapore Armed Forces (SAF) Overseas Training Award (Graduating) in 1992 and graduated from the University of Sydney with a Bachelor of Engineering (First Class Honours) in Aeronautical Engineering in 1996. He attended the United States Air Command and Staff College from 2004 to 2005 and obtained a Master in Operational Art and Science of War. He also achieved the best overall academic and research award for an international officer at the United States Air Command and Staff College.

In 2010, Tan received the SAF Overseas Postgraduate Scholarship (General Development) in 2010 and obtained a Master of Business Administration from the MIT Sloan School of Management in the same year.

Military career
Tan enlisted in the Singapore Armed Forces in 1990 and graduated as an Air Force (RSAF) officer from the Officer Cadet School in 1991. As an operational pilot, Tan has participated in overseas exercises in Australia, Brunei, India, Indonesia, Malaysia, the Philippines and Thailand. Throughout his military career, he held various appointments, including Commanding Officer of 121 Squadron, Head of the Air Plans Department from 2008 to 2010, and Commander of Air Defence and Operations Command (ADOC) from 2012 to 2014. He served as Director of Military Intelligence (DMI) and Chief of Command, Control, Communications, Computers and Intelligence (C4I) from February 2014 to February 2016.

Tan succeeded Hoo Cher Mou as the Chief of Air Force on 28 March 2016.

Tan was promoted to the rank of Major-General on 1 July 2016.

Awards

  Public Administration Medal (Military) (Gold), in 2017.
  Public Administration Medal (Military) (Silver), in 2010.
  Long Service Medal (Military), in 2016.
  Singapore Armed Forces Long Service and Good Conduct (20 Years) Medal
  Singapore Armed Forces Long Service and Good Conduct (10 Years) Medal with 15 year clasp
  Singapore Armed Forces Good Service Medal
  United States Legion of Merit (Commander Degree), in 2020, for strengthening defence relations between the United States and Singapore.

Personal life
Tan is married to Gina Yip and has one son and one daughter.

References

External links

|-

|-

Living people
Singaporean people of Chinese descent
Chief of the Republic of Singapore Air Force
University of Sydney alumni
MIT Sloan School of Management alumni
Air Command and Staff College alumni
Recipients of the Long Service Medal (Military) (Singapore)
Recipients of the Pingat Pentadbiran Awam (Tentera)
Recipients of the Legion of Merit
1972 births